Danced in the Fire is the fifth studio album by New Zealand singer songwriter Sharon O'Neill and first on the Polydor Records label.

Background and release
Sharon O'Neill signed her first contract with CBS in 1978. She released four top twenty albums in New Zealand between 1979 and 1983. A number of disputes followed, leading to an almost 5-year hiatus where O'Neill was not able to release music. O'Neill continued to write music however and in 1987 once the CBS contract had expired, O'Neill promptly signed a two-album deal with Polydor Records. "Physical Favours" was released as the first single in September 1987 and reached the top 40 in Australia and New Zealand. Danced on the Fire was released in October 1987.

During the legal battle, O'Neill began writing with others for the first time and some of this material was recorded for Danced in the Fire. She told The Sydney Morning Herald in 1987: "It was something to do when I couldn't record. It felt really weird at first, but I met a lot of good writers."

In a 2016 interview discussing album covers, O'Neill said "I always wore what I felt comfortable in... All I cared about was that I got to keep the leather jacket. The only time I had a stylist was for Danced in the Fire. I had boofy hair and a fan and to be perfectly honest it looked nothing like me but it was done already."

Track listing

Charts

References

1987 albums
Polydor Records albums
Sharon O'Neill albums